Xe-NONE is a Russian band from Kirov, formed in mid-2004. It began when Lexy Dance (vocals, programming) and Newman (synths, programming) worked on the crossing of a modern metal and electronic dance sound.

History

2004
The band was formed by Lexy Dance (vocals, programming) and Newman (synths, programming) in the summer of 2004. Their first line-up was completed with the addition of EvilAnn (female vocals), Schultz (bass), Max (guitar), and P2D2 (drums). At the same time they chose the name Xe-NONE, which fully marked the style and vision of the future project: Xenos (alien, Greek.) + NONE (nothing, English.)

October 1, 2004 they released their debut EP, called Digital Fucker. Thanks to the popularity and tangible support of the local press, the EP began to sell well in local rock stores. A debut performance by Xe-NONE on October 31, 2004 at the festival IMPACT was well received by festival attendees.

The reaction of local media after the festival was positive, with  "major" and "underground" newspapers publishing enthusiastic responses to the group, and the festival in general.

2005
In May 2005, P2D2 was replaced as the band’s drummer by Watson. In early August 2005 Xe-NONE began work on their second EP, which was completed in October 2005. Released on October 31, 2005, the mini-album Blood Rave included 5 brand-new tracks.

Immediately after the release of Blood Rave followed a series of trips outside of his native city. The song "Stars" was included in the collection Legacy of Metal Part 1, which was released in late 2005, on the St. Petersburg label Резонанс Music Resonance Music.

2006
In May 2006, they began recording their debut full-length album. Max left the band, and was replaced by Fucker, who had previously been in the band Mystery (now HMR).

In October 2006 Schultz left the band, and was replaced by Andrew Rex, formerly of the band Adeks. Xe-NONE debuted their completely new line-up on November 24 in the Central Organ "Victory" (Kirov)

2007
2007 saw the release of what was to come from their debut album in the form of the "Angels" Demo.

In July 2007, Xe-NONE performed at the annual Pushkin Media Group Rock Palace Open Air 2007, on the same stage with the best of the national heavy scenes (Vergeltung, Perimeter, Stardown) as well as Grave and Dismember.

At the end of November 2007 Xe-NONE completed work on their first video for the song "Angels". In the Autumn of 2007, the debut album was nearing completion.

2008
On May 15, 2007 debut full-length album Dance Metal [Rave]olution was released on their own label group RefLEXYa Records. Therefore, in addition to a traditional CD release, the album was also released onto the internet using an mp3 file and a PDF-page booklet, which contained the texts and illustrations for all the tracks on the album.

In July 2008, Watson decided to leave the band. He was replaced with Push, with whom the band played the album presentation in Moscow, as well as filmed the music video for "Digital Fucker AD".

In late August 2008, due to a serious injury, Push was temporarily forced to leave the group and Watson temporarily replaced him. Following the November concert in Moscow club "Relax", Andrew Rex left the band and in December 2008, Push returned to the band.

The band not only began working on their second full-length album, but also their long-conceived Eurodance inspired cover mini-album.

2009
On August 15, 2009 mini-album Dance Inferno Resurrection was released, containing seven covers of classic 90s hits. It was released on the internet for free download.

2010
In 2010 Xe-NONE released the four-track single "Cyber Girl". Now the band are working on completing their second full-length album. Xe-NONE won the remix competition run by the band Deathstars for their remix of the track "The Last Ammunition" that was released on the anniversary edition of Night Electric Night

2011
March 22, and the new album Dancefloration was released.

Discography

Albums
Dance Metal [Rave]olution (2008)
Dancefloration (2011)

Extended plays
Blood Rave (2005)
Dance Inferno Resurrection (2009)

Singles
Digital fucker (2004)
Angels Demo (2007)
Cyber Girl (2010)

Band members
Lexy Dance - Male Vocals
EvilAnn - Female Vocals
Newman - Synths
Fucker - Guitar
Push - Drums

References

External links
Official website

Musical groups established in 2004
Russian heavy metal musical groups